The Hans Stille Medal was a scientific award of the Deutsche Gesellschaft für Geowissenschaften (German Society for Geosciences), given to an individual who made outstanding contributions in the fields of geology and earth sciences. The award was named after German tectonicist Hans Stille and suspended in 2016.

Laureates

See also

 List of geology awards

References

External links 
 Geschichte des Geotektonischen Instituts, Berlin (PDF-Datei; 1,5 MB)
 Hans-Stille-Medaille der Geolog.Gesellschaft
 Preisträger 1948-2006 (PDF-Datei; 31 kB)

Geology awards
Awards established in 1948